Anton Anatolyevich Klimenko (born 27 March 1985) is a former Russian professional football player.

Club career
He played two seasons in the Russian Football National League for PFC Spartak Nalchik.

External links
 

1985 births
Living people
Russian footballers
Association football defenders
PFC Spartak Nalchik players
FC Energiya Volzhsky players